James Arias (born August 16, 1964) is a retired tennis touring professional player from the United States.

Biography
Arias was born in Grand Island, near Buffalo, New York. 

A baseliner, Arias turned pro at age 16 in 1980. His peak year was 1983, when as a 19-year-old he finished the year ranked World No. 6, having reached the U.S. Open semi-finals by defeating Jonathan Canter, Tom Gullikson, Gianni Ocleppo, Joakim Nyström and Yannick Noah, and then lost to Ivan Lendl. He also won the Italian Open and three other tour grand prix events.

He reached his career high ranking of World No. 5 in April 1984. He retired from the tour in 1994, having amassed a 286–223 singles playing record and over $1,800,000 in prize money.

With former World No. 2 tennis player, Andrea Jaeger, he won the 1981 French Open Mixed Doubles Championship.

Broadcast work
Arias serves as a commentator for ESPN International and Tennis Channel. Arias served as an analyst for NBC Sports coverage of Tennis at the 2008 Summer Olympics.  In Canada, he has worked as an analyst for Rogers Sportsnet and the Canadian Broadcasting Corporation on the broadcasts of the Rogers Cup.

Grand Slam finals

Mixed doubles (1 title)

Career finals

Singles (5 titles, 11 runner-ups)

References

External links

 
 
 
 Induction into the Greater Buffalo Sports Hall of Fame page

1964 births
Living people
American color commentators
American male tennis players
American television sports announcers
French Open champions
Grand Slam (tennis) champions in mixed doubles
Olympic tennis players of the United States
People from Grand Island, New York

Sportspeople from Buffalo, New York
Tennis commentators
Tennis people from New York (state)
Tennis players at the 1984 Summer Olympics